"Mezh Vysokikh Khlebov Zateryalosya" ( "Amid the Tall Grain Lost from Sight") is a Russian song based on a poem by Nikolay Nekrasov. In spite of its origin, the song is often regarded as a folk one, mainly due its incredible popularity.

Synopsys
The song focuses on the rural funeral of a young man, a city-dweller who shot himself dead.

The narrator, probably a peasant, begins his story with the mention of his own village. Later he describes the sequence of events: the death, police, the funeral… The village and the city are two different worlds. The peasants associate police, trials, money, and power with the opposite, "hostile space" of the city. However, they forgive the deceased.

Commentary

Historical background
Nekrasov wrote his poem Pokhorony ( The Funeral) between 22 and 25 June 1861, in Greshnevo. It was first published in Sovremennik, 1861.

In 1911, Nikolay Alexandrov set the poem to music.

Performance
The song was popularized by some well-known Russian and Soviet singers, e.g. by Vadim Kozin, by Ivan Skobtsov and, in particular, by Lidia Ruslanova.

References
Notes

Sources

Further reading

External links
 
 Mezh Vysokikh Khlebov Zateryalosya by Lidia Ruslanova (Moscow, 1943)

Lidia Ruslanova songs
1911 songs
Songs based on poems